Mark Peterson (April 19, 1960 – July 7, 2011) was an American soccer forward who played professionally in the North American Soccer League, Major Indoor Soccer League and Western Soccer Alliance.  He also earned six caps, scoring one goal, with the United States men's national soccer team.

Youth
Peterson was born and raised in Tacoma, Washington, where he attended Wilson High School.  He played soccer at Wilson, as well as for the Norpoint Royals Soccer Club.

Professional
Peterson elected to forgo college and joined the Seattle Sounders development program in 1979.  This was the Sounders' sixth season in the North American Soccer League (NASL).  In 1980, he was called up to the first team where he had an immediate impact.  In 34 games that year, he scored 18 goals.  Despite his prolific scoring pace, he came in second for 1980 Rookie of the Year to Jeff Durgan of the New York Cosmos, a youth teammate of Peterson's at the Norpoint Royals.  In 1981, Peterson experienced a sophomore slump, scoring only five goals in 21 games, but came back strong in 1982 to bag 19 goals in 38 games and take the 1982 North American Player of the Year honors.  In 1983, he continued his excellent work with the Sounders, but experienced a difficult playing situation.  The U.S. Soccer Federation (USSF) had placed the national team, known as Team America  into the NASL as one of the league's franchises.  They did this in order to create a more unified and successful team.  However, several top U.S. players, Peterson included, chose not to join Team America.  This sparked considerable consternation and bitterness within the national team as players with Team America criticized those who remained with their NASL teams.  The pressure on USSF and Team America mounted as the national team performed poorly.  Finally, USSF negotiated an agreement with the other NASL teams to allow them to loan U.S. players to Team America when they were not needed.  This resulted in Peterson playing 21 games in 1983 for the Sounders and 7 games for Team America.  Unfortunately for Peterson, both the Sounders and Team America folded at the end of the 1983 season.  On October 2, 1983, he was selected by the New York Cosmos in the Sounders’ dispersal draft.  He never played for the Cosmos as the NASL began to collapse.  On November 24, 1983, he signed a two-year contract with Tacoma Stars of Major Indoor Soccer League.  He led the team in scoring during the 1983–1984 season.  In March 1987, he signed with F.C. Seattle in the Western Soccer Alliance.

National team
Despite his proven scoring ability, Peterson earned only six caps with the United States men's national soccer team between 1980 and 1985.  In 1980, he was still a young player and had difficulty breaking into the U.S. front line of Boris Bandov, Steve Moyers and Angelo DiBernardo.  In 1981 and 1982, the national team played only a single game each year, Peterson had no part in either one.  His last game was a 1–1 World Cup Qualifier tie with Costa Rica on May 26, 1985.

Peterson coached the North Tacoma Soccer Club until his death on July 7, 2011.

References

External links
 Sounders Bio
 NASL/MISL stats

1960 births
2011 deaths
American soccer players
Seattle Storm (soccer) players
North American Soccer League (1968–1984) players
North American Soccer League (1968–1984) indoor players
Team America (NASL) players
Seattle Sounders (1974–1983) players
Major Indoor Soccer League (1978–1992) players
Tacoma Stars players
Western Soccer Alliance players
Soccer players from Tacoma, Washington
United States men's international soccer players
Association football forwards